The Ovid Prize, established in 2002, is a literary prize awarded annually to an author from any country, in recognition of a body of work. It is named in honour of the Roman poet Ovid, who died in exile in Tomis (contemporary Constanța), on the Black Sea, in Romania. Laureates are awarded 10,000 euros.

The Ovid Festival Prize, worth 5,000 euros, was also established in 2002. Past recipients include George Szirtes, Tomaž Šalamun, and Ismail Kadare. The prize underwent a change of mandate in 2007. Since 2008, it has been awarded to a prominent young talent.

History
Both Prizes are the joint initiative of the Writers' Union of Romania and the Romanian Cultural Institute. The winners are nominated by the Festival jury. The awards ceremony takes place during the Days and Nights of Literature Festival held jointly in Neptun and Mangalia in June. The Prize is also referred to as the Ovidius Prize.

Past recipients include Orhan Pamuk, Andrei Codrescu, Amos Oz, Jorge Semprún and António Lobo Antunes. 

The 2011 Laureate was the Czech writer Milan Kundera. In a letter addressed to the chairman of the jury, Kundera, who could not attend the ceremony, accepted the award. Kundera donated the prize to Humanitas Publishing House, which has published most of his works in a Romanian translation, with the mention that the money should go to assisting Romanian literature. The 2012 edition was cancelled due to lack of funds.

List of Laureates

2011
Milan Kundera, France
Ognjen Spahić, Montenegro

2010
Jean d'Ormesson, France
Madeleine Thien, Canada

2009
Péter Esterházy, Hungary
Joey Goebel, USA

2008
Orhan Pamuk, Turkey
Irina Denezhkina, Russia

2007
Yevgeny Yevtushenko, Russia

2006
Andrei Codrescu, USA/Romania
George Szirtes, Great Britain

2005
Mario Vargas Llosa, Peru
Cengiz Bektaş, Turkey

2004
Amos Oz, Israel
Tomaž Šalamun, Slovenia

2003
António Lobo Antunes, Portugal
Ismail Kadare, Albania

2002
Jorge Semprún, Spain
Alain Robbe-Grillet, France

See also 

 List of literary awards
 List of poetry awards

References

External links
 Romanian Writers' Union
 Romanian Cultural Institute

Fiction awards
International literary awards
Romanian literary awards
Awards established in 2002
2002 establishments in Romania
Ovid